The Burr-Brown Corporation was an American technology company in Tucson, Arizona, which designed, manufactured, and marketed a broad line of proprietary, standard, high-performance, analog and mixed-signal integrated circuits (ICs) used in electronic signal processing.  The company's products were used in a wide range of applications: industrial process and control, including nuclear power generation, telecommunications, test and measurement, medical and scientific instrumentation, medical imaging, digital audio and video, personal computing and multimedia. 
 
In September 2000, Texas Instruments acquired the company for US$7.6 billion.

History 
In 1983, the company reincorporated in Delaware and went public with stock trading on NASDAQ under the symbol BBRC.

The company was incorporated in Tucson, Arizona in 1956 by founders Page Burr (Princeton 1944) and  Thomas R. Brown Jr. (BS MIT 1949, MBA Harvard 1952) to commercialize semiconductor transistors; in 1959, the company posted its first profit. Brown eventually bought out Burr's share of the company.

The company employed over 1,300 people worldwide with manufacturing and technical facilities located in Tucson, Arizona; Atsugi, Japan; and Livingston, Scotland. Company headquarters was located in Tucson.

Burr-Brown was one of the principal suppliers of precision analog and data acquisition products to the electronic industry. The company pioneered many analog semiconductor products and techniques, such as active laser-trimming.

References

External links 

 

Semiconductor companies of the United States
Electronics companies of the United States
Companies based in Tucson, Arizona